The alpine chipmunk (Neotamias alpinus) is a species of chipmunk native to the high elevations of the Sierra Nevada of California.

Description 
Alpine chipmunks share the typical pattern of genus Neotamias, being gray-brown overall and featuring three white stripes on the cheeks and four down the back. The flanks are muted orange. Overall the pattern is much paler compared to most species. They weigh 27-45 grams.

Distribution 

Alpine chipmunks only live in high Sierra Nevada, from Yosemite National Park in the north, to Olancha Peak in the south. They have been observed at altitudes from around 2,300 meters (7,500 ft) to 3,900 meters (12,800 ft), though they rarely occur below 2,500 meters (8,200 ft).

Behavior and ecology 
The alpine chipmunk feeds on the seeds of sedges, grasses, and other plants in their namesake alpine zone. They generally eat their food on the ground. They do not generally require a source of water other than food, but will use it given the opportunity.

They nest in crevices between rocks, taking advantage of the micro-climatic conditions (i.e. higher temperatures) that exist there. Their young are born in June and July, in litters of 3–6.

They are considered diurnal, though they exhibit some nocturnal activity during the summer. They hibernate from November through April, frequently awakening to eat.

References

External links

Neotamias
Fauna of the Sierra Nevada (United States)
Endemic fauna of California
Endemic fauna of Nevada
Mammals of the United States
Rodents of North America
Mammals described in 1893
Taxa named by Clinton Hart Merriam